The Malviya Nagar Metro Station is located on the Yellow Line of the Delhi Metro.

It is located near the PVR Cinemas multiplex, just north of Saket's A block. It is nearer to Geetanjali Enclave than to Malviya Nagar.

Station layout

Facilities
List of available ATM at Malviya Nagar metro station are SBI

Entry/exit
It has 2 exits: the first one is the Geetanjali Enclave exit which opens inside the colony of the same name and the other is the Malviya Nagar exit.

Connections

Bus
Delhi Transport Corporation bus routes number 0OMS (+), 448, 448A, 448CL, 493, 500, 512, 522A, 534, 534A, 548, 548CL, 548EXT, 680, AC-534, OMS (+), OMS (+) AC, serves the station from nearby A Block Saket bus stop.

See also 
New Delhi
Malviya Nagar (Delhi)
List of Delhi Metro stations
Transport in Delhi
Delhi Metro Rail Corporation
Delhi Suburban Railway
Delhi Transport Corporation
South Delhi
National Capital Region (India)
List of rapid transit systems
List of metro systems

References

External links

 Delhi Metro Rail Corporation Ltd. (Official site) 
 Delhi Metro Annual Reports
 

Delhi Metro stations
Railway stations opened in 2010
Railway stations in South Delhi district
2010 establishments in Delhi
Memorials to Madan Mohan Malaviya